Patrini may refer to:

Patrini, area around Santameri Castle, Greece
Patrini, character in In the French Style